"Bridged by a Lightwave" is a song by Canadian electronic music producer Deadmau5 and singer-songwriter Kiesza, released as a single on November 10, 2020. It is an EDM song featuring vocals by Kiesza.

Track listing

Charts

References

2020 singles
2020 songs
Deadmau5 songs
Kiesza songs
Songs written by Deadmau5
Songs written by Kiesza